RHS Garden Bridgewater is the Royal Horticultural Society's fifth public display garden. It is located in the village of Worsley in Salford, Greater Manchester, England.

Gardens
It is the RHS's first new garden since it acquired Harlow Carr in North Yorkshire in 2001, and is one of Europe's largest gardening projects.

Landscape architect Tom Stuart-Smith has created the overall plan, in which the walled kitchen garden will be restored, historic features such as the tree-lined Garden Approach recreated, and the lost terraces reworked. Marcus Chilton-Jones has been appointed the first curator of the garden.

Funding
The expected total cost of the project was £32.7m, of which the RHS invested £15.7m of its own funds and received (by December 2019) a further £12.7m through grants and fundraising, including a £5m grant from the Garfield Weston Foundation and further donations from Salford City Council.

History
In May 2022, the visitors' centre The Welcome Building was crowned by the Royal Institute of British Architects as the North West Building of the Year. It was praised for its "sustainable and engaging" design.

Television
The BBC filmed a four part series about the construction process at the garden titled The Great Northern Garden Build, which began broadcasting on BBC Two from 10 May 2021, just before the 18 May 2021 opening date.

See also 
 List of botanical gardens
 RHS Garden Harlow Carr
 RHS Garden Hyde Hall
 RHS Garden Rosemoor
 RHS Garden Wisley

References

External links
  – official site

Bridgewater
Botanical gardens in England
Gardens in Greater Manchester
Tourist attractions in Salford